Tromsø Hockey is an ice hockey team from Tromsø. While being from Norway, and under the Norwegian Ice Hockey Association the team plays its games as a part of the Swedish Ice Hockey Association's League 3. The team was founded on 9 March 2004 but played in a league for the first time in 2011–2012.

There are age-specific teams at every level of which three teams participate in Swedish Ice Hockey Association and one team participates in an international league, the Barents Hockey League.

The team's colors are blue and white.

References

External links 
Official website
The Norwegian Ice Hockey Association

Ice hockey teams in Norway
Sport in Tromsø